Platycis is a genus of beetles belonging to the family Lycidae.

The species of this genus are found in Europe, Japan, Africa and Northern America.

Species:
 Platycis minutus (Fabricius, 1787) 
 Platycis nasutus (Keisenwetter, 1874)

References

Lycidae